Atala (minor planet designation: 152 Atala) is a large main belt asteroid that was discovered by brothers Paul Henry and Prosper Henry on 2 November 1875, but the discovery was credited to Paul. It is a type D asteroid, meaning that it is composed of carbon, organic rich silicates and possibly water ice.

The asteroid is named for the eponymous heroine of the 1801 novella Atala by François-René de Chateaubriand. The Henry brothers also named the last of their discoveries, 186 Celuta, after another Chateaubriand heroine. Both Atala and Céluta are American Indian fictional characters.

An occultation of a star by Atala was observed from Japan on 11 March 1994.  Subsequent occultations have been observed as recently as 2006.

Photometric of this asteroid made in 1981 gave a light curve with a period of 5.282 ± 0.004 hours with a brightness variation of 0.50 in magnitude.

References

External links 
 Occultation of TYC 5558-01048-1 by (152) Atala on 2006 May 7 UT
 (152) Atala near opposition 5 July 2007 (2.38AU from Earth)
 
 

000152
Discoveries by Paul Henry and Prosper Henry
Named minor planets
000152
000152
000152
18751102
François-René de Chateaubriand